Stancliffe is a surname. Notable people with the surname include:

David Stancliffe (born 1942), Anglican bishop of Salisbury, Wiltshire, UK
Michael Staffurth Stancliffe (1916–1987), Dean of Winchester from 1969 to 1986
Paul Stancliffe, (born 1951), football player from 1975 to 1994
George Stancliffe, (born 1955), author of Speed Reading 4 Kids, 3rd edition (2003)

See also
Stancliffe Hall, listed building in Darley Dale, Derbyshire
, cargo ship operated by Stanhope Steamship Co Ltd in the 1940s